Cryptassiminea insolata is a species of minute operculate snail, a marine gastropod mollusk or micromollusk in the family Assimineidae.

Description

Distribution

References

External links

Assimineidae
Gastropods described in 2005